Luis Armando Córdova Díaz (born 30 December 1968) is a Mexican politician affiliated with the PRI. He currently serves as Deputy of the LXII Legislature of the Mexican Congress representing Jalisco, and previously served in the Congress of Jalisco.

References

1968 births
Living people
Politicians from Jalisco
Institutional Revolutionary Party politicians
21st-century Mexican politicians
University of Guadalajara alumni
Members of the Congress of Jalisco
Deputies of the LXII Legislature of Mexico
Members of the Chamber of Deputies (Mexico) for Jalisco